<mapframe
text="Former location of the Long Sault rapids"
width=250 	
height=250	
zoom=10
latitude=45.009
longitude=-74.88/>
Long Sault was a rapid in the St. Lawrence River upstream and west of Cornwall, Ontario. Sault is the archaic spelling of the French word saut, meaning rapids.

The Long Sault created a navigation barrier along the river for much of its history, motivating the construction of the Moses-Saunders Power Dam, part of the St. Lawrence Seaway, in the 1950s as the size of ships and the volume of shipping traffic along the river began to exceed the capacity of the area's canal locks.

The construction required the flooding of a large swath of land near the rapids to facilitate a hydroelectric dam and to make the rapids area more navigable. The flooded region includes Ontario's Lost Villages.

The Long Sault Parkway takes its name from the rapids.

See also
 Cornwall Canal
 Eisenhower Lock

References

Saint Lawrence Seaway
Landforms of the United Counties of Stormont, Dundas and Glengarry
Bodies of water of Ontario
Rapids of Canada